Buck Run may refer to: 

Buck Run (Little Muncy Creek tributary), in Lycoming County, Pennsylvania
Buck Run (West Branch Brandywine Creek tributary) in Chester County, Pennsylvania
Buck Run (West Branch Conococheague Creek tributary) in Franklin County, Pennsylvania
Buck Run, in Schuylkill County, Pennsylvania
Buck Run (Buffalo Creek tributary), in Washington County, Pennsylvania